Berlin, I Love You is a 2019 anthology romantic drama film starring an ensemble cast. A joint German and U.S. production, it serves as an installment of the Cities of Love, series created by Emmanuel Benbihy.

It was released on February 8, 2019 in the United States, by Saban Films, and on August 8, 2019 in Germany, by Warner Bros. Pictures.

Cast

Production
It was announced in October 2017 that filming had begun on the latest instalment of the Cities of Love series, and would conclude in November. Amongst the announced cast included Helen Mirren, Keira Knightley, Jim Sturgess, Mickey Rourke, and Diego Luna. Emily Beecham was announced as being cast in June 2018. A trailer shared by Dianna Agron, who stars in and directs a segment of the film, revealed the involvements of Luke Wilson, Charlotte Le Bon and Iwan Rheon.

Saban Films acquired the distribution rights for the film in May 2018.

In February 2019, artist Ai Weiwei claimed that his section of Berlin, I Love You was cut due to pressure from China's government. "The reason we were given for the episode’s removal [..] was that my political status had made it difficult for the production team."

Reception
Berlin, I Love You received negative reviews from film critics. On Metacritic, the film holds a rating of 34 out of 100, based on eight critics, indicating "generally unfavorable reviews".

References

External links

2019 films
American anthology films
German anthology films
American romantic drama films
German romantic drama films
Films shot in Berlin
English-language German films
Films directed by Peter Chelsom
Films directed by Fernando Eimbcke
Films directed by Dennis Gansel
Films directed by Dani Levy
Saban Films films
2010s American films
2010s German films